Denklingen is one of 107 localities that make up the German municipality of Reichshof in Oberbergischer Kreis. It is part of the region of Cologne in North Rhine-Westphalia.
It is close to the towns of Gummersbach, Cologne, and Siegen. As of 2003, the population of Denklingen is 2249.

Denklingen is also the name of a municipality in Upper Bavaria.

Towns in North Rhine-Westphalia